This article lists events during the year 2016 in Senegal.

Incumbents
President: Macky Sall
Prime Minister: Mohammed Dionne

Events

March
20 March - The constitution referendum took place
23 March - The referendum passes with 63% voting yes to shorter presidential terms.

Sports

19 June: US Gorée won the Senegal Premier League football championship

Deaths

References

Links

 
Years of the 21st century in Senegal
2010s in Senegal
Senegal
Senegal